Romanos the Melodist (late 5th-century — after 555) was a Byzantine hymnographer and composer, who is a central early figure in the history of Byzantine music. Called "the Pindar of rhythmic poetry", he flourished during the sixth century, though the earliest manuscripts of his works are dated centuries after this. He was the foremost Kontakion composer of his time.

Life
The main source of information about the life of Romanos comes from the Menaion for October. Beyond this, his name is mentioned by only two other ancient sources. once in the eighth-century poet St. Germanos and once in the Souda (s. v. anaklomenon) where he is called "Romanos the melodist". From this scanty evidence we learn that he was born to a Jewish family in either Emesa (modern-day Homs) or Damascus in Syria. He was baptized as a young boy (though whether or not his parents also converted is uncertain). Having moved to Berytus (Beirut), he was ordained a deacon in the Church of the Resurrection there.

He later moved to Constantinople during the reign of the emperor Anastasius—on the question whether Anastasius I (491-518) or Anastasius II (713-716) is meant, the renowned Byzantinologist Prof. Karl Krumbacher favours the earlier date. There he served as sacristan in the "Great Church" (Hagia Sophia), residing to the end of his life at the Monastery of Kyros, where he was buried along with his disciple St. Ananias.

If those scholars who believe that he lived during the reign of the earlier Anastasius are correct, then he may have continued writing during the reign of Emperor Justinian (527-65), who was himself a hymn-writer; this would make him a contemporary of two other famous Byzantine hymnographers, Anastasios and Kyriakos.

Legend
According to legend, Romanus was not at first considered to be either a talented reader or singer. He was, however, loved by the Patriarch of Constantinople because of his great humility. Once, around the year 518, while serving in the Church of the Panagia at Blachernae, during the All-Night Vigil for the Feast of the Nativity of Christ, he was assigned to read the kathisma verses from the Psalter. He read so poorly that another reader had to take his place. Some of the lesser clergy ridiculed Romanus for this, and being humiliated he sat down in one of the choir stalls. Overcome by weariness and sorrow, he soon fell asleep. As he slept, the Theotokos (Mother of God) appeared to him with a scroll in her hand. She commanded him to eat the scroll, and as soon as he did so, he awoke. He immediately received a blessing from the Patriarch, mounted the ambo (pulpit), and chanted extemporaneously his famous Kontakion of the Nativity, "Today the Virgin gives birth to Him Who is above all being…." The emperor, the patriarch, the clergy, and the entire congregation were amazed at both the profound theology of the hymn and Romanos' clear, sonorous voice as he sang. According to tradition, this was the very first kontakion ever sung. The Greek word "kontakion" refers to the shaft on which a scroll is wound, hence the significance of the Theotokos' command for him to swallow a scroll, indicating that his compositions were by divine inspiration.  The scene of Romanos's first performance is often shown in the lower register of Pokrov icons (example above).

Works

Romanos wrote in an Atticized literary koine—i.e., he had a popular, but elevated style—and abundant Semiticisms support the view that he was of Jewish origin. Arresting imagery, sharp metaphors and similes, bold comparisons, antitheses, coining of successful maxims, and vivid dramatization characterize his style.

He is said to have composed more than 1,000 hymns or kontakia celebrating various festivals of the ecclesiastical year, the lives of the saints and other sacred subjects, some 60 to 80 of which survive (though not all those attributed to him may be genuine). The earliest manuscripts of his works are dated centuries after his lifetime, akin to those of his successors Andrew of Crete and Kassia. The oldest editions of full texts are dated to the 11th century.

Today, usually only the first strophe of each kontakion is chanted during the divine services, the full hymn having been replaced by the canon. A full kontakion was a poetic sermon composed of from 18 to 30 verses or ikoi, each with a refrain, and united by an acrostic.  When it was sung to an original melody, it was called an idiomelon.  Originally, Saint Romanos' works were known simply as "psalms", "odes", or "poems".  It was only in the ninth century that the term kontakion came into use.

Among his known works are kontakia on:
 The Nativity of Christ
 The Martyrdom of St Stephen
 The Death of a Monk
 The Last Judgment
 The Prodigal Son
 The Raising of Lazarus (for Lazarus Saturday, the day before Palm Sunday)
 Adam's Lament (for Palm Sunday)
 The Treachery of Judas

His Kontakion of the Nativity is still considered to be his masterpiece, and up until the twelfth century it was sung every year at the imperial banquet on that feast by the joint choirs of Hagia Sophia and of the Church of the Holy Apostles in Constantinople. Most of the poem takes the form of a dialogue between the Mother of God and the Magi, whose visit to the newborn Christ Child is celebrated in the Byzantine rite on 25 December, rather than on the 6th of January when Western Christians celebrate the visit (in the Orthodox Church, January 6, the Feast of the Theophany, celebrates the Baptism of Christ).

Of his other Kontakia, one of the most well-known is the hymn, "My soul, my soul, why sleepest thou..." which is chanted as part of the service of the "Great Canon" of Andrew of Crete on the fifth Thursday of Great Lent.

Romanos is one of many persons who have been credited with composing the famous Akathist Hymn to the Theotokos, which is still sung during Great Lent. Most recent scholarship has asserted that he is not the author of the hymn, although there is significant dissent among scholars.

Karl Krumbacher published in Munich several previously unpublished chants of Romanos and other hymnographers, from manuscripts discovered in the library of the Monastery of St John the Theologian in Patmos. There exists in the library of Moscow a Greek manuscript which contains kontakia and oikoi for the whole year, but does not include all compositions of Romanos.

Krumbacher says of his work:
 In poetic talent, fire of inspiration, depth of feeling, and elevation of language, he far surpasses all the other melodes. The literary history of the future will perhaps acclaim Romanos for the greatest ecclesiastical poet of all ages.

Legacy and depictions
Although in more recent icons Saint Romanos is depicted standing on the ambo (directly in front of the iconostasis) and wearing a deacon's sticharion, the famous Russian church musicologist, Johann von Gardner, points out that in the oldest icons he is portrayed wearing the shorter red tunic of a singer and standing on a raised platform in the middle of the church.

In the Eastern Orthodox Church, Saint Romanos is the patron saint of music; he is celebrated yearly on 1 October.

The Armenian Apostolic Church commemorates Saint Romanos on the Saturday before the third Sunday of the Exaltation of the Cross. This is a remarkable fact given that Saint Romanos lived after the Council of Chalcedon and the Armenian Apostolic Church is non-Chalcedonian. Nevertheless, his music significantly influenced Armenian hymnography.

Editions and translations
 Sancti Romani Melodi Cantica. Vol. 1: Cantica Genuina. – Vol. 2: Cantica Dubia. Ed. by Paul Maas and Constantine A. Trypanis. Oxford, 1963–1970. (complete edition)
 J. B. Pitra, Analecta Sacra, i. (1876), containing 29 poems, and Sanctus Romanus Veterum Melodorum Princeps (1888), with three additional hymns from the Monastery at Patmos. See also Pitra's Hymnographie de l'église grecque (1867)
 Karl Krumbacher, Geschichte der byzantinischen Litteratur (Munich, 1897)
 —Studien zu Romanos (Munich, 1899)
 —Umarbeitungen bei Romanos (Munich, 1899)

Notes

References
 Romanos the Melodist article from the Catholic Encyclopedia
 St. Romanos (Russian Orthodox Church Outside of Russia)

Further reading
 Thomas Arentzen, The Virgin in Song: Mary and the Poetry of Romanos the Melodist (Philadelphia, 2017)
 Sarah Gador-Whyte, Theology and Poetry in Early Byzantium: The Kontakia of Romanos the Melodist (Cambridge UK, 2017)
 José Grosdidier de Matons, Romanos le Mélode et les origines de la poésie religieuse à Byzance (Paris, 1977)

External links
 
 
 The Kontakia of Romanos 71 selections
 Digitalized manuscripts of Romanos the Melodist at the Princeton University Library

490s births
550s deaths
6th-century composers
5th-century Byzantine people
6th-century Byzantine people
Byzantine composers
Syrian Christian saints
6th-century Christian saints
Byzantine Jews
Byzantine Empire
Byzantine Empire
Byzantine saints
Byzantine hymnographers